Essential dignity, in astrology, refers to the relative strength or weakness of a planet or point's zodiac position by sign and degree, or its essence—what the 17th-century astrologer William Lilly called "the strength, fortitude or debility of the Planets [or] significators." In other words, essential dignity seeks to view the strengths of a planet or point as though it were isolated from other factors in the sky of the natal chart.

By comparison, accidental dignity indicates how much strength a planet or point derives from its  position in a natal chart, such as its relation to the other factors in the chart:  for example, its proximity to other planets, or to the four angles of the chart, or to stars, as well as the aspects (or symmetrical angular connections) it forms with other planets or points in the chart.

For example, the essential dignity of Mars, if located at 27 degrees of Capricorn would take into account the fact that Mars is exalted in Capricorn, and also that it is the "bounds" ruler of the 27th degree of Capricorn and also the face ruler of the 27th degree of Capricorn.  This is a considerably dignified Mars.

If that Mars were located in the twelfth house of a natal chart Mars's accidental dignity would be poor, since it would be located in a weak or malevolent cadent house.  Were Mars to also be squared to a malevolent planet, such as Saturn, and would be receiving a dexter square aspect from malefic Saturn, ruler of Capricorn, this would further hinder Mars's strength and ability to operate benevolently.  These accidental dignity factors would tend to weaken a Mars which is otherwise strong in essential dignity.

Traditionally the five essential dignities are:

Domicile (rulership or house) + detriment
Exaltation + fall
Triplicity
Terms (or "bounds")
Face (or "decan")

For post-Classical astrologers, such as Bonatti or Lilly, the dignities had a hierarchy.  The most important dignity was domicile rulership; slightly less important was exaltation.  Triplicity rulerships were still fairly important in medieval astrology, but nowhere near as vital as they were for Hellenistic astrologers such as Ptolemy.  Terms or bounds rulerships became very much diminished in importance, and face rulers were almost entirely ignored.  (Lilly  said that the only function face rulers served was to keep a planet from being entirely peregrine—that is, without any essential dignity whatever—which was considered a malefic condition.)

However, Hellenistic astrologers had a very different view of the dignities.  To earlier astrologers, such as Ptolemy and Vettius Valens, domicile rulership, exaltation, triplicity rulership and bounds rulership were all of equal strength in influence.

Many modern astrologers take little heed of essential dignities, with the exception of domicile rulerships (see article on ruling planets.)  This is most likely the result of the simplification of astrological technique that occurred when astrology lost popularity beginning in the eighteenth century (see History of astrology.)

Table of the most commonly used of the traditional essential dignities

Modern dignities

Many modern astrologers, eschewing the use of the other essential dignities, use the three outer planets, Uranus, Neptune and Pluto as the modern rulers of Aquarius, Pisces and Scorpio, respectively.  The practice derives from the similarity between the nature of the planets with the nature of these signs. This as illustrated by the differences in the two "decans" tables above. It has also included more recently the dwarf planets Ceres and Eris relating them to Virgo and Libra, the same as the signs Scorpio, Aquarius and Pisces.

Decanate dignities

See also
Dwadasama

Notes

Citations

Works cited

Further reading 

Technical factors of Western astrology